Coimbatore South or 'Coimbatore (South)' is a legislative assembly constituency in the Indian state of Tamil Nadu. Its State Assembly Constituency number is 120. It covers parts of Coimbatore. Coimbatore South assembly constituency is a part of the Coimbatore parliamentary constituency. It is one of the 234 State Legislative Assembly Constituencies in Tamil Nadu.

Members in Tamil Nadu Legislative Assembly

Election Results

2021

2016

2011

References

External links
 

Assembly constituencies of Tamil Nadu
Government of Coimbatore